Ourense-Empalme Railway Station  is the main railway station of Ourense, Spain.

Services

References

Railway stations in Galicia (Spain)
Buildings and structures in the Province of Ourense
Ourense